Abrahám Pressburger (7 May 1924 - 24 July 2018) was a Jewish-Czech partisan during World War II. He lived in Israel.

Life
Abrahám Pressburger was born in Czechoslovakia and during World War II he was arrested and sent to the Sereď concentration camp. He later escaped and joined Jewish guerrilla warfare group Hashomer Hatzair. He also participated in the Slovak National Uprising.

References

External links 
 Abraham Pressburger (1924) (Memory of Nations) 
 Pravda o partyzánech: Neřízení, hladoví, bez munice (Aktuálně.cz) 

2018 deaths
Czech people of World War II
Czech resistance members
Czechoslovak emigrants to Israel
Jewish partisans
1924 births
Sereď concentration camp survivors